Frederick Povey (March 1, 1884 – December 28, 1969) was a Canadian professional ice hockey player. He played with the Haileybury Hockey Club and Montreal Canadiens of the National Hockey Association. Povey also spent time in the Western Pennsylvania Hockey League with the Pittsburgh Bankers and Pittsburgh Lyceum.

References

External links
Fred Povey at JustSportsStats

1884 births
1969 deaths
Haileybury Comets players
Ice hockey people from Quebec
Montreal Canadiens (NHA) players
Pittsburgh Lyceum (ice hockey) players
Pittsburgh Bankers players
Sportspeople from Sherbrooke
Canadian ice hockey defencemen